Tritonoturris lifouana is a species of sea snail, a marine gastropod mollusk in the family Raphitomidae.

Description
The length of the shell varies between 8 mm and 14 mm.

Distribution
This marine species occurs off the Loyalty Islands and Papua New Guinea.

References

 Sysoev, A.V. (2008) Turridae. In Poppe, G. T. (Ed.) Philippine Marine Mollusks. Volume II. ConchBooks, Hackenheim, Germany, pp. 732–815. NIZT 682

External links
 Hervier J. (1897 ["1896"]). Descriptions d'espèces nouvelles de l'Archipel de la Nouvelle-Calédonie. Journal de Conchyliologie. 44: 138-151
 Gastropods.com: Daphnella lifouana
 

lifouana
Gastropods described in 1897